This article lists political parties in Cape Verde. Cape Verde has a two-party system, which means that there are two dominant political parties (PAICV and MpD), with extreme difficulty for anybody to achieve electoral success under the banner of any other party.

List of parties

Parties represented in the National Assembly

Other parties 
Democratic Convergence Party (Partido da Convergência Democrática, PCD)
Democratic Renewal Party (Partido da Renovação Democrática, PRD) 
Labour and Solidarity Party (Partido de Trabalho e Solidariedade, PTS)
Social Democratic Party (Partido Social Democrático, PSD)

Defunct alliance
Democratic Alliance for Change (Aliança Democrática para a Mudança, ADM)

See also
Lists of political parties

References

Cape Verde
 
Political parties
Political parties
Cape Verde